"Rosanna" is a song written by David Paich and performed by the American rock band Toto, the opening track and the first single from their 1982 album Toto IV. This song won the Grammy Award for Record of the Year at the 1983 ceremony. "Rosanna" was also nominated for the Song of the Year award. It is regarded for the half-time shuffle which drummer Jeff Porcaro developed for the song. The groove has become an important staple of drum repertoire and is commonly known as the "Rosanna shuffle".

The song reached number 2 on the Billboard Hot 100 for five consecutive weeks, behind "Don't You Want Me" by the Human League and "Eye of the Tiger" by Survivor. It was also one of the band's most successful singles in the UK, peaking at No. 12 on the UK Singles Chart and remaining on the chart for eight weeks.

Composition and lyrics
The song was written by David Paich, who has said that the song is based on numerous girls he had known. As a joke, the band members initially played along with the common assumption that the song was based on Rosanna Arquette, who was dating Toto keyboard player Steve Porcaro at the time. Arquette herself played along with the joke, commenting in an interview that the song was about "my showing up at 4 a.m., bringing them juice and beer at their sessions."

In the verses, the key is changed from G major to F major, accompanied on the original recording by the lead vocalist changing from Steve Lukather to Bobby Kimball.

The drum pattern is known as a "half-time shuffle", and shows "definite jazz influence", featuring ghost notes and derived from the combination of the Purdie shuffle, Led Zeppelin drummer John Bonham's shuffle on "Fool in the Rain", and the Bo Diddley beat. The Purdie shuffle can be prominently heard on Steely Dan's track "Home at Last" from Aja, which Jeff Porcaro cited as an influence.

The overlapping keyboard solos in the middle were created by David Paich and Steve Porcaro recording a multitude of keyboard lines (some of which were cut from the final recording) using a Micro-Composer, a Minimoog, Yamaha CS-80s, Prophets, a Hammond organ, and a GS1, among other instruments. Paich credits Porcaro with both coming up with the concept for the segment and playing a majority of the parts. The album version starts with the drum beat only then kicks into the rest of the melody, then ends with two renditions of the song's chorus and goes into a musical interlude and fades out from there. According to Lukather, this final instrumental section was a spontaneous jam during the recording session: "... the song was supposed to end but Jeff carried on and Dave started playing the honky-tonk piano and we all just followed on." The single edit goes right into the melody at the beginning, then the song fades out during the first singing of the chorus at the end.

Steve Porcaro and Lukather describe it as "the ultimate Toto track".  Cash Box said that it "is a varied palette of pleasing pop shades."  Billboard said "The arrangement is more complex than anything Toto's known for, mixing rock power chords with softer passages."

Classic Rock History critic Brian Kachejian rated it as Toto's greatest song, saying that it was "Easily one of the 1980’s best singles."

Music video
The West Side Story-inspired video was directed by Steve Barron and set in a stylized urban streetscape, with Rosanna represented by a dancer whose bright red dress contrasts with the gray surroundings. The band plays within a chain-link fence enclosure. Cynthia Rhodes is featured as the lead dancer Rosanna, which led to her being cast in Staying Alive the following year. Patrick Swayze was also uncredited as a dancer in the music video and he and Rhodes would both star in the movie Dirty Dancing.

Despite not playing on the actual recording, new bassist Mike Porcaro (brother of Jeff and Steve) appears in the video, as original Toto bass player David Hungate left before the video was made. Lenny Castro is also featured with the band as a percussionist.

Personnel
 Toto
 David Paich – synthesizers, piano, Hammond organ, backing vocals, horn arrangements
 Steve Lukather – lead and backing vocals, guitar
 Bobby Kimball – lead and backing vocals
 Jeff Porcaro – drums
 Steve Porcaro – synthesizers, Hammond organ
 David Hungate – bass

 Guest musicians
 Lenny Castro – percussion, conga
 Tom Scott – saxophone
 Jim Horn – saxophone
 Gary Grant – trumpet
 Jerry Hey – trumpet and horn arrangements
 James Pankow – trombone
 Tom Kelly – backing vocal

Charts

Weekly charts

Year-end charts

All-time charts

Sales and certifications

Weezer cover
In 2018, American rock band Weezer released a cover of the track to poke fun at an attempt by fans to get them to cover "Africa", another song by Toto. Weezer went on to release a cover of "Africa" five days later.

In popular culture
The song is featured in the Season 4 episode of The Middle titled "The Hose".

References

External links
 Lyrics on official Toto website
 MusicStack information

1982 songs
1982 singles
2018 singles
Toto (band) songs
Songs written by David Paich
Music videos directed by Steve Barron
Columbia Records singles
Grammy Award for Record of the Year
Grammy Award for Best Instrumental Arrangement Accompanying Vocalist(s)
Grammy Award for Best Vocal Arrangement for Two or More Voices